Beinn an Eoin may refer to the following mountains:

 Beinn an Eoin (Coigach)
 Beinn an Eoin (Torridon)